Theodore Frank Snyder (August 15, 1881 in Freeport, Illinois – July 16, 1965 in Woodland Hills, California), was an American composer, lyricist, and music publisher. His hits include "The Sheik of Araby" (1921) and "Who's Sorry Now?" (1923). In 1970, he was inducted into the Songwriters Hall of Fame. , his compositions have been used in more than twenty motion pictures.

Early life 
Born in Freeport, Illinois, Snyder grew up in Boscobel, Wisconsin. He learned to play the piano as a boy and as a young man returned to Illinois to work in Chicago as a pianist in a café before being employed by a music publishing company.

Career 

Snyder moved to New York in 1904 after working in Chicago plugging musical compositions.

In 1907, Snyder had his first musical composition published and the following year set up his own music publishing business in New York City. He gave Irving Berlin his first break in 1909 when he hired him as a staff writer for his company and the two eventually became business partners. In 1914, Ted Snyder became one of the founding members of ASCAP.

Snyder's growing name as a top-line composer led to his compositions being used in stage plays with the first to make it to Broadway in 1908. Following his teaming up with Irving Berlin, the two were hired to perform and sing their music in the 1910 musical Up and Down Broadway. Snyder would become widely known to a later generation through hits such as 1921's "The Sheik of Araby" recorded by several artists including Duke Ellington (in 1932), Benny Goodman (in 1937), and The Beatles (in 1962, Decca Audition).

The most notable of Snyder's works is "Who's Sorry Now?" written in 1923 in collaboration with Bert Kalmar and Harry Ruby. "Who's Sorry Now?" became a No.1 hit on the UK Singles Chart for Connie Francis in 1958 and went to No. 4 on the American Billboard charts. In 2000, it was named one of the Songs of the Century by the Recording Industry Association of America.

In 1930, Snyder retired from the songwriting business and moved to California, where he opened a Hollywood nightclub. , his compositions have been used in about twenty-two motion pictures from 1926's The Sheik of Araby, to the 1946's Marx Brothers' A Night in Casablanca, to 1979's All That Jazz, to 2002's The Good Girl.

Death and legacy 
Ted Snyder died in 1965 in Woodland Hills and was interred in the Oakwood Memorial Park Cemetery in Chatsworth, California.

In 1970, he was inducted into the Songwriters Hall of Fame.

In 1985, the heirs to his music copyrights were party to Mills Music, Inc. v. Snyder.

Work on Broadway 
 Funabashi (1908), musical – contributing lyricist
 Up and Down Broadway (1910), musical – performer
 Fashions of 1924 (1924), revue – composer
 Fosse (1999), revue – featured songwriter for "Who's Sorry Now?"

References 
Notes

Citations

External links 
 Ted Snyder entry at the Songwriters Hall of Fame
 
 
 
 

 Discographies
 [ Discography] at Allmusic: less complete credits, but all recordings and covers
 Discography at the Songwriters Hall of Fame: more complete credits, but no dates
 Ted Snyder recordings at the Discography of American Historical Recordings.

1881 births
1965 deaths
American musical theatre composers
Burials at Oakwood Memorial Park Cemetery
People from Boscobel, Wisconsin
People from Freeport, Illinois
Ragtime composers